The 2014 AFC U-19 Championship was the 38th edition of the biennial international youth football tournament organized by the Asian Football Confederation (AFC) for players aged 19 and below. Myanmar were approved as hosts of the competition on 25 April 2013. The tournament was held from 9 to 23 October 2014, with the top four teams qualifying for the 2015 FIFA U-20 World Cup in New Zealand.

Qatar won the tournament, and were joined by North Korea, hosts Myanmar, and Uzbekistan as AFC qualifiers for the 2015 FIFA U-20 World Cup.

Venues

Qualification

The draw for the qualifiers was held on 26 April 2013 in Kuala Lumpur, Malaysia.

Qualified teams

 (hosts)

Draw
The draw for the competition was held on 24 April 2014 in Yangon, Myanmar.

Squads

Only players born on or after 1 January 1995 are eligible to compete in the 2014 AFC U-19 Championship. Each team can register a maximum of 23 players (minimum three of whom must be goalkeepers).

Group stage
The top two teams from each group advanced to the quarter-finals.

If two or more teams are equal on points on completion of the group matches, the following criteria were applied to determine the rankings.
 Greater number of points obtained in the group matches between the teams concerned;
 Goal difference resulting from the group matches between the teams concerned;
 Greater number of goals scored in the group matches between the teams concerned;
 Goal difference in all the group matches;
 Greater number of goals scored in all the group matches;
 Kicks from the penalty mark if only two teams are involved and they are both on the field of play;
 Fewer score calculated according to the number of yellow and red cards received in the group matches;
 Drawing of lots.

All times are local (UTC+6:30).

Group A

Group B

Group C

Group D

Knockout stage
In the knockout stage, extra time and penalty shoot-out are used to decide the winner if necessary.

Quarter-finals
Winners qualified for 2015 FIFA U-20 World Cup.

Semi-finals

Final

Winners

Qualified teams for the 2015 FIFA U-20 World Cup
The top four teams qualified for the 2015 FIFA U-20 World Cup:
  (winners)
  (runners-up)
  (semi-finalists) (debut)
  (semi-finalists)

Awards

Goalscorers
5 goals

 Jo Kwang-myong
 Ahmed Al Saadi
 Zabikhillo Urinboev

4 goals

 Takumi Minamino
 Akram Afif

3 goals

 Kim Gun-hee
 Nyein Chan Aung
 Almoez Ali
 Patiphan Pinsermsootsri

2 goals

 Wei Shihao
 Emad Mohsin
 Kim Yu-song
 So Jong-hyok
 Aung Thu
 Chenrop Samphaodi
 Ahmed Al Attas
 Hoàng Thanh Tùng

1 goal

 Brandon Borrello
 Jaushua Sotirio
 Stefan Mauk
 Gui Hong
 Tang Shi
 Wei Jingzong
 Dimas Drajad
 Paulo Sitanggang
 Amin Mazloum
 Yousef Seyyedi
 Sadegh Moharrami
 Ayman Hussein
 Alaa Ali Mhawi
 Layth Tahseen
 Sherko Karim
 Bashar Rasan
 Yosuke Ideguchi
 Shinnosuke Nakatani
 Masaya Okugawa
 Kim Kuk-chol
 Paik Seung-ho
 Hwang Hee-chan
 Lee Jung-bin
 Shim Je-hyeok
 Than Paing
 Marwan Mubarak
 Ahmed Moein
 Serigne Abdou Thiam
 Thanasit Siriphala
 Mohamed Al-Akbari
 Abdullah Ghanem
 Saeed Jassem
 Khalfan Mubarak
 Ahmed Rabee
 Dostonbek Khamdamov
 Otabek Shukurov
 Eldor Shomurodov
 Ahmed Al-Sarori
 Khaled Hussein
 Gehad Mohammed

Own goal
 Alaa Ali Shiyadi (playing against Iraq)

References

External links
, the-AFC.com

 
2014
U-19 Championship
2014
2014 in Burmese football
2014 in youth association football
October 2014 sports events in Asia